The Hundsberg is a hill of Hesse, Germany. It is a northeastern peak of the 
Wattenberg massif.

Hills of Hesse